The Huawei Ideos Tablet S7 is an Android 3G tablet/phone with a 7-inch touch-screen that has 800*480 resolution, it runs Android 2.1, can connect via Wifi, has stereo sound and a gravity sensor.

It is sold in Australia by Telstra as the T-Touch Tab.  It is the cheapest tablet in Australia, according to PC World "the T-Touch Tab is effectively alone as an affordable, entry-level tablet that doesn't skimp on too many features".  It is sold exclusively by Telstra for use on the Telstra Next G network.

References

Tablet computers
Huawei products